This list of cemeteries in Illinois includes currently operating, historical (closed for new interments), and defunct (graves abandoned or removed) cemeteries, columbaria, and mausolea which are historical and/or notable. It does not include pet cemeteries.

Adams County 
 Ebenezer Methodist Episcopal Chapel and Cemetery, Golden
 Quincy National Cemetery, Quincy; NRHP-listed
 Woodland Cemetery, Quincy

Bureau County 
 Oakland Cemetery, Princeton

Cook County

DuPage County 

 Mount Emblem Cemetery, Elmhurst

Effingham County 
 Ramsey Cemetery, rural

Fulton County 
 Oak Hill Cemetery, Lewistown

Ogle County

Jackson County 

 Woodlawn Cemetery, Carbondale

Jersey County 
 Oak Grove Cemetery, Jerseyville

Jo Daviess County 
 Greenwood Cemetery, Galena

Lake County 
 Lake Forest Cemetery, Lake Forest

LaSalle County 
 Ottawa Avenue Cemetery, Ottawa
 Summit View Cemetery, Ottawa

Livingston County 
 Bayou Cemetery,  Cornell

Hancock County 
 Smith Family Cemetery, Nauvoo

Henderson County 
 South Henderson Church, Gladstone; NRHP-listed

Macoupin County 
 Union Miners Cemetery, Mount Olive; NRHP-listed

Madison County 
 Alton National Cemetery, Alton; NRHP-listed

McHenry County 
 Mount Auburn Cemetery, Harvard

McLean County 
 Benjaminville Friends Meeting House and Burial Ground, Holder
 Evergreen Cemetery, Bloomington

Peoria County 
 Springdale Cemetery, Peoria

Pulaski County 

 Mound City National Cemetery, Mound City; NRHP-listed

Rock Island County 
 Chippiannock Cemetery, Rock Island
 Riverside Cemetery, Moline
 Rock Island National Cemetery, Rock Island; NRHP-listed

Sangamon County 
 Camp Butler National Cemetery, near Springfield; NRHP-listed
 Oak Ridge Cemetery, Springfield

Union County 
 Campground Church and Cemetery Site, Anna; NRHP-listed

Vermilion County

Will County 
 Abraham Lincoln National Cemetery, Elwood

Winnebago County 
 Greenwood Cemetery, Rockford

See also

 List of cemeteries in the United States

References

 

Illinois